Khader (also Romanized as Khāder; also known as Khādīr) is a village in Kuhak Rural District, in the Central District of Jahrom County, Fars Province, Iran. As per 2006 census, its population was 98, in 23 families.

References 

Populated places in Jahrom County